WHCP-LP is a Variety formatted broadcast radio station licensed to Cambridge, Maryland and serving Cambridge and Algonquin in Maryland.  WHCP-LP is owned and operated by Cambridge Community Radio, Inc.

See also
List of community radio stations in the United States

References

External links
 WHCP Radio Online
 

2015 establishments in Maryland
Variety radio stations in the United States
Radio stations established in 2015
HCP-LP
HCP-LP
Cambridge, Maryland
Community radio stations in the United States